The Grand Meadow Quarry Archaeological District in Mower County, Minnesota is a 170-acre historic district which was listed on the National Register of Historic Places in 1994. The principal site within the District is The Grand Meadow Chert Quarry (21MW8). The original quarry was recorded as being 170 acres, now mostly under land plowed or developed, but a pristine 8-acre remnant of the original quarry still exists in a small woods, alongside 5 acres of restored prairie. That portion of the site, purchased by The Archaeological Conservancy as an archaeological preserve, is being developed for public access with a self-guided walking tour by the Prairie Island Indian Community and the Mower County Historical Society.

The chert quarry, first identified by Grand Meadow resident Maynard Green, was an Indigenous open-pit mine with perhaps as many as two thousand pits that were dug using handheld tools. These pits were dug in order to extract nodules of "Grand Meadow Chert," a stone used by Native Americans to make many everyday tools, including spear points, arrowheads, drills, knives and hide scrapers. The earliest known use of Grand Meadow Chert is from a bison kill near Granite Falls (21YM47), in a context that was C-14 dated to 7700-8000 B.P.  This microcrystalline tool stone can range in color from olive gray to light yellow gray to very light gray. This quarry is the only known culturally utilized source for Grand Meadow Chert, which has been found at archaeological sites in 52 counties in Minnesota.

References

National Register of Historic Places in Mower County, Minnesota
Historic districts on the National Register of Historic Places in Minnesota
Quarries in the United States
Archaeological sites in Minnesota